TGG Group is the holding company for three units: TGG, its core consulting and advisory division; The Greatest Good, a consulting business serving non-profit organizations; and, TGG Ventures, an innovation and co-venturing arm. TGG is a consulting firm that heavily relies on behavioral economics and data analysis.

Notable current and former employees
 Vikram Pandit, chairman
 Andrew M. Rosenfield, CEO
 Steven Levitt, co-founder
 Daniel Kahneman, co-founder
 Gary Becker, co-founder
 Amee Kamdar, co-founder and former managing partner 
 Lewis B. Kaden, senior advisor
 Daron Acemoglu, academic affiliate
 Max H. Bazerman, academic affiliate
 Raj Chetty, academic affiliate
 Atul Gawande, academic affiliate
 Edward Glaeser, academic affiliate
 David Laibson, academic affiliate
 Nathan Myhrvold, academic affiliate
 Emily Oster, academic affiliate
 Steven Pinker, academic affiliate
 Lisa Randall, academic affiliate
 Jesse Shapiro, academic affiliate
 Richard Thaler, academic affiliate
 Cass Sunstein, academic affiliate
 Sudhir Venkatesh, academic affiliate
 Elke U. Weber, academic affiliate

References

External links
 Official website
 Interview with Steven Levitt on forbes.com

Management consulting firms of the United States
Macroeconomics consulting firms
Companies based in Chicago
2009 establishments in Illinois
Consulting firms established in 2009
American companies established in 2009